The Speaker of the Legislative Assembly is a title in active politics to represent a principal spokesman/spokeswoman of the state legislative assemblies in India for carrying house proceedings. He is empowered to determine the status of a bill submitted to the house by the state legislators. Elected by the members of assembly, this post is held by two politicians for two identical roles such as "speaker" and "deputy speaker" for assembly session proceedings. In case one fails to attend the session due to some uncertainties such as resignation, illness or death, deputy speaker acts as a presiding officer until a new speaker is elected.

It is created under the Article 178 of the Constitution of India. The Indian constitution also allows all states and union territories for the appointment of a speaker. The two members are elected at anytime after the state election is declared. In Indian political system, the time frame for the election of a speaker and deputy speaker is determined by the state legislators independently. The election date for the post of speaker is decided by the state governor while deputy speaker election date is specified by speaker.

Role 
A speaker is responsible for presiding assembly debates and maintains order and discipline of the house during legislative session. He decides "when a member should be called upon to speak and how long he be allowed to speak". Questions relating breach of privilege and contempt of the house is raised by the members with consent of the Speaker or the Deputy Speaker.

With regard to matters within the assembly house or related to the members of the legislative assembly, it is the right of the Speaker to interpret the constitution and rules. The prime responsibility of the speaker is to maintain discipline and order in the house by practicing disciplinary privileges granted by the constitution of India.

List of speakers and deputy speakers

References 

Speakers of state lower houses in India